Lucy Walters (born May 20, 1980), is a British-American actress best known for playing the role of Holly Weaver on Power.

Filmography

Awards and nominations

References

External links 
 
 

1980 births
Living people
21st-century American actresses
American television actresses
British actresses
British film actresses
British expatriate actresses in the United States